Ruslan Takhiruly Baltiyev (Rūslan Tahirūly Baltiev; born 16 September 1978) is a Kazakh professional football coach, official and a former player who played as a midfielder. He is an assistant coach with the Kazakhstan national team. He is a former Kazakh international, whom he is the top goalscorer.

Club career
Baltiyev started his career in FC Zhetysu in 1997 and after a remarkable first season in professional football moved to Kazakhstani grand FC Kairat. He also made his debut for the national team in the same year. After 4 seasons in the domestic league, his play got noticed by Russian club FC Sokol Saratov. Baltiyev spent 2 seasons with the Russian Premier League club and established a good name in Russian football. After his team's relegation in 2002, he was linked with transfers to Ukrainian and Russian top sides, and eventually found himself at FC Dinamo Moskva, where he became a key player in the season of 2003, having played all matches, helping the club to finish 6th in the league. After a successful season with Dinamo Baltiyev completed a move to another Moscow side FC Moscow, where after two seasons he failed to keep his place in the main squad and returned to Kazakhstan, to play for one of the strongest teams of the domestic league FC Tobol. Baltiyev was one of the best players in the league and helped his new club Tobol to compete for the title and play in European competitions. In December 2009 Baltiyev signed a 2-year contract with FC Zhemchuzhina-Sochi, Russian First Division club.

Career statistics

Honours

Kyzylzhar
Runner-up
Kazakhstan Premier League: 2000
Kazakhstan Cup: 1999–2000

Tobol
Winner
Kazakhstan Cup: 2007
Runner-up
Kazakhstan Premier League (2): 2007, 2008

International goals

References

External links 
 Ruslan Baltiyev – International Appearances at RSSSF.com
 
 

1978 births
Sportspeople from Almaty
Living people
Kazakhstani footballers
Kazakhstani expatriate footballers
FC Kairat players
FC Kyzylzhar players
FC Dynamo Moscow players
FC Moscow players
FC Shinnik Yaroslavl players
FC Sokol Saratov players
FC Tobol players
Association football midfielders
Kazakhstan international footballers
FC Zhemchuzhina Sochi players
Expatriate footballers in Russia
Russian Premier League players
Kazakhstan Premier League players
Footballers at the 1998 Asian Games
Asian Games competitors for Kazakhstan
Kazakhstani football managers